Hannah Nuttall (born 7 July 1997) is a British athlete. She competes in middle-distance and cross-country running events.

Early life
Nuttall ran as a youngster for Charnwood Athletics club. Nuttall attended Loughborough College and had her first experience of representing Britain at the 2015 junior World Cross Country Championships held in Guiyang, China. She attended the University of New Mexico, and completed a master's degree at Loughborough University.

Career
In 2021 she won the mixed relay at the 2021 European Cross Country Championships held in Dublin.

In February 2023, Nuttall finished runner-up at the British national indoors championships over 3000m. She was subsequently selected for the Great Britain squad for the 2023 European Indoor Championships held in Istanbul for the 3000m. She qualified for the final in the 3000m. Nuttall ran a personal best time of 8:46.30 as she achieved a fifth-placed finish in the final.

Personal life
Nuttall is the daughter of former athletes Alison Wyeth and John Nuttall. Her brother Luke Nuttall is also an athlete.

References

External links

1997 births
Living people
Sportspeople from Loughborough
British female middle-distance runners
British female cross country runners
Alumni of Loughborough University
University of New Mexico alumni